Saint-Bernard is a commune in the Ain department in eastern France.

It is located on the banks of the river Saône approximately 20 km north of Lyon. It has a small castle which overlooks the river and the village church.

Population

Personalities
The artist Maurice Utrillo is reported to have lived in the castle and completed a number of his works there.

See also
Communes of the Ain department

References

Communes of Ain
Ain communes articles needing translation from French Wikipedia